The 2017–18 Grambling State Lady Tigers basketball team represents Grambling State University in the 2017-18 NCAA Division I women's basketball season. They are led by new coach Freddie Murray, who was promoted to interim and then hired full-time after former coach Nadine Domond departed to become an assistant coach at Rutgers.

On January 3, 2018, Shakyla Hill became the fourth player in NCAA Division I history (men's and women's) to record a quadruple-double; it had not been done since Lester Hudson did it in 2007. In the Lady Tigers' 93–71 win over the Alabama A&M Lady Bulldogs, Hill recorded 15 points, 10 rebounds, 10 assists, and 10 steals.

Roster

Schedule

|-
!colspan=9 style=""|Non-conference regular season
|-

|-
!colspan=9 style=""|SWAC regular season
|-

|-
!colspan=9 style=""| SWAC Women's Tournament

|-
!colspan=9 style=""| NCAA Women's Tournament

Schedule source:

See also
2017–18 Grambling State Tigers men's basketball team

References

Grambling State
Grambling State Tigers women's basketball seasons
Grambling State
Grambling State
Grambling State